Kadavoor is a small village in Paingottoor Gram panchayat in Kothamangalam Taluk at the eastern border of the Ernakulam district, state of Kerala, India. It is located about twenty kilometres away from the nearby towns Muvattupuzha, Kothamangalam and Thodupuzha.

References

External links 
 

Villages in Ernakulam district